Limak (also Romanized as Līmāk) is a village in Chehel Shahid Rural District, in the Central District of Ramsar County, Mazandaran Province, Iran. At the 2006 census, its population was 1,010, in 286 families. They are Gilaks and speak Gilaki language.

References 

Populated places in Ramsar County